Marthe Wéry (1930–2005) was a Belgian painter.

1930 births
2005 deaths
Belgian women
People from Etterbeek
20th-century Belgian painters